Cristiceps australis, the crested weedfish, is a species of clinid found around southern Australia in the subtidal zone from low water to depths of about  preferring areas with plentiful seaweed growth.  This species can reach a length of  TL.

References

australis
Fish described in 1836